Poljana is a settlement on the left bank of the Meža River in the Municipality of Prevalje in the Carinthia region in northern Slovenia, close to the border with Austria.

History
Poljana was the site of the Battle of Poljana in May 1945, the last significant clash of arms of World War II in the European theater.

Mass grave
Poljana is the site of a mass grave from the end of the Second World War. The Poljana Mass Grave is located southwest of the village, between the road and the Meža River. It contains the remains of an undetermined number of Croatian soldiers killed in the Battle of Poljana and possibly also civilians that were liquidated after the surrender on 15 May 1945.

Church

The local church is dedicated to John the Baptist. It dates to the early 14th century and is an early Gothic church preserved with very few adaptations. Its internal furnishings date to 1640. It belongs to the Parish of Prevalje.

References

External links
Poljana on Geopedia

Populated places in the Municipality of Prevalje